Sohra Bridge is a multilingual Indian drama film that conjures magical realism. This film was directed by Bappaditya Bandopadhyay and released in the banner of Homemade Films on 26 February 2016 posthumously of director. The movie's title is inspired by a bridge in Cherrapunji near East Khasi hills in Meghalaya. The dialogue of the film is in Bengali, Assamese and Khasi.

Plot
The movie tells a story of a girl who embarks on a liberating journey across the remote expanses of Northeast India, searching for her estranged father. While searching, she goes on a trip to Sohra. Some of the events that happen there may be real or may be her imagination. She wanders about to address issues left unresolved by her father.

Cast
 Barun Chanda as Ria's father
 Niharika Singh as Ria
 Nishita Goswami
 Moumita Mitra
 Paul Phukan
 Merlvin J Mukhim
 Pratik Sen as Asish
 Raj Banerjee

References

External links
 

2016 films
2016 multilingual films
Films set in Assam
Indian multilingual films
Magic realism films
Films directed by Bappaditya Bandopadhyay
Bengali-language Indian films
2010s Bengali-language films
2010s Assamese-language films